Craig Point (born January 19, 1986), is an Iroquois lacrosse player who currently plays for the Rochester Knighthawks of the National Lacrosse League and the Six Nations Chiefs of Major Series Lacrosse.  He was born in Ohsweken, Ontario, and comes from the Six Nations of the Grand River First Nation.

Amateur career
Point led the Six Nations Arrows of the OLA Junior A Lacrosse League to four straight league championships and a Minto Cup national championship in 2007. He also played on the Iroquois Nationals team in the 2015 FIL World Indoor Lacrosse Championship, leading the team in scoring and earning a silver medal.

In 2006, Point led Onondaga Community College to an undefeated season and a NJCAA National Championship.

National Lacrosse League career
The Boston Blazers drafted Point in the first round (third overall) in the 2007 NLL Entry Draft. Point was traded to the Minnesota Swarm prior to the 2008 NLL season.  Making an immediate impact on the league, Point was named Rookie of the Week four times and Rookie of the Month in February. After the season, was awarded the Rookie of the Year award and was named the All-Rookie team.

In February 2009, Point was traded along with Dean Hill to the Rochester Knighthawks for Aaron Wilson.

Point was a member of the 2012 and 2013 Champion's Cup winning Rochester Knighthawks.

Canadian Senior "A" career
Point was a member of the 2013 Mann Cup champion Six Nations Chiefs.

Major League Lacrosse career
Point was a member of the Nationals for three seasons: the first two when the team played in Toronto, and the third after the team moved to Hamilton. Although he was a member of the 2009 Steinfeld Cup winning Toronto Nationals, he played only three regular-season games with the team and did not appear in any playoff games.

Statistics

Major League Lacrosse
Reference:

National Lacrosse League
Reference:

Point is still participating in the 2014 NLL playoffs.

Canadian Lacrosse Association
Reference:

Awards

References

1986 births
Living people
Iroquois nations lacrosse players
Lacrosse people from Ontario
Minnesota Swarm players
National Lacrosse League major award winners
Native American sportspeople
Rochester Knighthawks players
Hamilton Nationals players
First Nations sportspeople
Onondaga Lazers athletes
College men's lacrosse players in the United States
Lacrosse forwards
Lacrosse midfielders